PCOA or PCoA may refer to:

 Plasmid-encoded copper resistance determinant, an Escherichia coli operon responsible for copper homeostasis
 Police Civilian Oversight Authority, a Jamaican body entitled to monitor the Police Forces
 Posterior communicating artery, a pair of blood vessels in the circle of Willis
 Principal coordinates analysis (or classical multidimensional scaling), a statistical method used to explore similarities in data set
 Principal component analysis (abbreviated usually as PCA), a related mathematical procedure of data conversion into linearly uncorrelated variables
 Proprietary Change of Address, a type of service offered by commercial providers that supplement National Change Of Address database